Zhanerke Perme (born 12 July 1996) is a Kazakhstani footballer who plays as a midfielder for Women's Championship club SDYUSSHOR №8 and the Kazakhstan women's national team.

References

1996 births
Living people
Kazakhstani women's footballers
Women's association football midfielders
Kazakhstan women's international footballers